Stromateus is a genus of bony fish from the butterfish family Stromateidae, of which it is the type genus.

Species
There are three species within the genus Stromateus:

Stromateus brasiliensis Fowler, 1906 (Southwest Atlantic butterfish)
Stromateus fiatola Linnaeus, 1758 (blue butterfish)
Stromateus stellatus Cuvier, 1829 (starry butterfish)

References

Stromateidae
Taxa named by Carl Linnaeus